Ithycythara rubricata, common name reddish mangelia, is a species of sea snail, a marine gastropod mollusc in the family Mangeliidae.

This species may be an older name for Ithycythara auberiana

Description
The length of the shell attains 6 mm.  The shell is very distantly ribbed, closely transversely striate. Its color is yellowish white to chestnut.

Distribution
This marine species occurs off Florida and the West Indies.

References

External links
  Tucker, J.K. 2004 Catalog of recent and fossil turrids (Mollusca: Gastropoda). Zootaxa 682:1–1295.
 Biolib.cz: images of Ithycythara rubricata

rubricata
Gastropods described in 1846